Edith Bayne (née Wall, 13 November 1904 – 21 April 2012) was an artist born in New Zealand who also resided in Australia.

Biography 
Born Edith Wall in Christchurch, New Zealand, to Gypsy and Arnold Wall, her father was a professor and broadcaster. In the early 1940s, Wall moved to Sydney, Australia. Wall attended the Sorbonne in Paris and also studied art in Rome and London. Wall was an early member of The Group and exhibited with them in 1927, 1928, and 1947.

After moving to Sydney, Wall became a prolific cartoonist. She also taught art and exhibited in galleries in Melbourne and Sydney.

In 1956 Wall received the Victorian Artists Society drawing prize and in 1971 the Minnie Crouch prize from the Bendigo Art Gallery.

Personal life 
In the mid-1930s she married Oscar Bayne, an architect from Sydney. They had one child, Cosima, born in 1937. In 1951 they moved to Melbourne, Australia.

References

Further reading 
Artist files for Edith Wall are held at:
 E. H. McCormick Research Library, Auckland Art Gallery Toi o Tāmaki
 Robert and Barbara Stewart Library and Archives, Christchurch Art Gallery Te Puna o Waiwhetu
 Hocken Collections Uare Taoka o Hākena
Also see:
 Concise Dictionary of New Zealand Artists McGahey, Kate (2000) Gilt Edge

1904 births
1990 deaths
20th-century Australian women artists
20th-century Australian artists
20th-century New Zealand women artists
New Zealand painters
Australian painters
New Zealand women painters
Australian women painters
New Zealand women cartoonists
Australian women cartoonists
New Zealand cartoonists
Australian cartoonists
New Zealand centenarians
Australian centenarians
University of Paris alumni
People from Christchurch
Artists from Melbourne
Women centenarians
People associated with The Group (New Zealand art)